The 3rd African-American Film Critics Association Awards, honoring the best in filmmaking of 2005, were given on 30 December 2005.

Top 10 Films
 Crash
 The Constant Gardener
 Good Night, and Good Luck.
 Brokeback Mountain
 Syriana
 Walk the Line
 Hustle & Flow
 Capote
 Batman Begins
 North Country

Winners
Achievement Honor:
John Singleton; producer of Hustle & Flow
Best Actor:
Terrence Howard - Hustle & Flow
Best Actress:
Felicity Huffman - Transamerica

References
http://www.cinemablend.com/new/Crash-Speeds-To-The-Top-1983.html

2005 film awards
African-American Film Critics Association Awards